The 2021–22 NCAA Division I women's basketball season began on November 9, 2021. The regular season ended on March 6, 2022, with the 2022 NCAA Division I women's basketball tournament beginning on March 18, and ending with the championship game at the Target Center in Minneapolis on April 3.

Rule changes
The following rule changes were recommended by the NCAA Basketball Rules Committee and approved by the Playing Rules Oversight Panel for the 2021–22 season:

 Live statistics may be transmitted to the bench area for coaching purposes.
 In an experimental rule, conferences could apply for an NCAA waiver to allow transmission of live video feeds to the bench in conference games. This was still prohibited during nonconference games. (Previously, only preloaded video had been allowed in the bench area.)
 The following adjustments were made to reply review rules:
 Officials can use replay to review any out-of-bounds play, regardless of the number of players involved. Previously, only deflections involving two players could be reviewed.
 Coaches may request review of the result of a play involving the restricted area or lower defensive box at any time in the game. Previously, this play could only be reviewed by officials in the last two minutes of the game (or at the same time in an overtime period). An unsuccessful coach-initiated review results in that team losing a timeout.
 Officials can now use replay to determine whether a basket should count when a player commits a foul away from the ball. Coaches may request this review at any time (at the cost of a timeout if the review is unsuccessful); officials can initiate a review on their own only in the last two minutes of the game (or overtime period).

Season headlines
Two of the most significant developments impacting the 2021–22 season took place before the end of the 2020–21 school year, with one occurring before the start of the 2020–21 basketball season.
 On October 14, 2020, the NCAA announced that all student-athletes in winter sports during the 2020–21 school year, including men's and women's basketball, would receive an extra year of athletic eligibility.
 On April 15, 2021, the NCAA Division I Council adopted legislation that extended the so-called "one-time transfer exception" to all D-I sports, with the Division I Board of Directors ratifying this on April 28. This allows student-athletes in baseball, men's and women's basketball, football, and men's ice hockey to transfer one time without having to sit out a year, placing them under the same transfer regulations that previously applied to all other D-I sports.

Other news:
 May 6, 2021 – The University of Hartford's governing board voted to begin the process of transitioning the school's athletic program from Division I to NCAA Division III. The plan calls for the following steps:
 January 2022: Formal request for reclassification with the NCAA.
 2022–23: No athletic scholarships will be awarded to incoming students.
 2023–24: Become a provisional member in a D-III conference to be determined; transition remaining students off athletic scholarships by the end of that school year.
 2024–25: Become a full member of the aforementioned D-III conference.
 2025–26: Full D-III membership. 
 July 21 – The Houston Chronicle reported that Oklahoma and Texas had approached the Southeastern Conference about the possibility of joining that league, and that an announcement could come in early August. The SEC and both schools refused comment on this report, but did not issue definitive denials.
 July 26 – Oklahoma and Texas notified the Big 12 Conference that the two schools do not wish to extend their grant of television rights beyond the 2024–25 athletic year and intend to leave the conference.
 July 27 – Oklahoma and Texas reached out to the SEC about acceptance into the conference in 2025.
 July 28 – The Big 12 sent a cease-and-desist letter to ESPN, accusing the network of tortious interference by working with other conferences attempting to lure Big 12 members in a bid to ease Oklahoma's and Texas' exits for the SEC. The network denied the allegations.
 July 29 – The presidents and chancellors of the 14 current SEC members voted unanimously to extend invitations to Oklahoma and Texas, effective in 2025.
 July 30 – Oklahoma and Texas formally accepted the SEC's invitations.
 August 3 – An independent review commissioned by the NCAA and conducted by the law firm Kaplan Hecker & Fink following the controversy that erupted on social media over the disparities in amenities between the Division I men's and women's basketball tournaments was issued. Among the recommendations:
 The men's and women's Final Fours should be a combined event held at a single site.
 The "March Madness" branding, previously used only for the men's tournament, should be extended to the women's tournament. The NCAA had already announced that it would do so before the report was issued.
 The women's tournament field should be expanded to 68 teams to match the men's tournament.
 Media rights for the women's tournament, currently bundled with rights for more than two dozen other NCAA championships and sold separately from the men's tournament, should be decoupled from those other championships once the current contract for those championships expires.
 If possible, the NCAA's current contract with CBS and Turner to broadcast the men's tournament, which gives said media companies control of sponsorships for all NCAA championship events—even those broadcast by other entities—should be renegotiated in order to make it easier for companies to sponsor NCAA championships other than the men's tournament. 
 The current system by which a significant amount of revenue from the men's tournament is returned to Division I members should be extended to the women's tournament.
 September 3
 Multiple media outlets reported that the Big 12 was on the verge of inviting four schools—American Athletic Conference members Cincinnati, Houston, and UCF, plus BYU, a West Coast Conference member and an FBS independent in football. All four schools were reportedly preparing membership applications, and their future entrance could be approved as early as the next scheduled meeting of Big 12 presidents on September 10. The entry timeline was uncertain at the time of the report, but would most likely be in 2024.
 Baylor announced that basketball, soccer, and volleyball, the last three Baylor women's sports still using the "Lady Bears" nickname, would drop "Lady" effective immediately. The soccer and volleyball teams had changed their social media accounts to reflect this change several days earlier.
 September 10 – BYU, Cincinnati, Houston, and UCF were officially announced as incoming Big 12 members no later than 2024–25.
 October 18 – Yahoo Sports reported that The American was preparing to receive applications from six of the 14 members of Conference USA—Charlotte, Florida Atlantic, North Texas, Rice, UAB, and UTSA.
 October 19 – ESPN reported that all six C-USA members named in Yahoo Sports' report had submitted applications to The American, and that each would receive a formal letter by the end of that week (October 22) detailing the terms of expansion.
 October 21 – The six aforementioned C-USA members were announced as incoming members of The American at a date to be determined.
 October 22 – The Action Network reported that C-USA member Southern Miss had accepted an invitation to join the Sun Belt Conference in 2023, though no formal announcement had then been made. The report added that the Sun Belt was preparing to add two other C-USA members, Marshall and Old Dominion, as well as FCS program James Madison. At the time, some formal announcements of new members were expected on October 25, but a Marshall announcement was likely to wait until after the school announced its new president on October 28. The report also indicated that the Sun Belt would expel its two full non-football members, Little Rock and UT Arlington, after the 2022–23 season.
 October 26 – Southern Miss was officially announced as a Sun Belt member, effective no later than July 2023. In other Sun Belt realignment news, it was reported that Old Dominion's arrival would be announced later that week, and that James Madison's board had scheduled an emergency meeting on October 29 (presumably to discuss a Sun Belt invitation).
 October 27 – Old Dominion was officially announced as a Sun Belt member, also effective no later than July 2023. This marked ODU's return to that conference after an absence of more than 30 years.
 October 30 – The day after both the Sun Belt Conference and Marshall issued tweets indicating that the Thundering Herd had accepted a Sun Belt invitation, this move was officially announced.
 November 5 – Conference USA, which had nine of its schools depart to other conferences, announced that ASUN Conference members Jacksonville State and Liberty and Western Athletic Conference members New Mexico State and Sam Houston would join C-USA no later than July 2023.
 November 6 – James Madison made its move to the Sun Belt official, initially effective no later than July 2023.
 November 12
 The WAC announced that Incarnate Word would join from the Southland Conference in July 2022.
 Utah governor Spencer Cox signed a bill passed by the Utah State Legislature that changed the name of Dixie State University to Utah Tech University, effective in the 2022–23 school year. The nickname of Trailblazers was not affected.
 November 16
 The Atlantic 10 Conference announced that Loyola Chicago would join from the Missouri Valley Conference after the 2021–22 season.
 CBS Sports reported that the MVC had entered into talks with three schools regarding future membership—Summit League member Kansas City, Ohio Valley Conference member Murray State, and non-football Sun Belt member UT Arlington. The report indicated that the latter two schools were seen as the strongest candidates, but all three were likely to receive invitations in the coming months.
 November 17 – The NCAA announced that the women's tournament would expand from 64 to 68 teams, effective with the 2022 tournament. This was another recommendation made in the August 2021 gender equity report. For the 2022 tournament only, the four extra games, held using the same format as the existing men's First Four, will be held on campuses of teams seeded in the top 16. From 2023 on, the women's First Four will be held at a neutral site to be determined.
 December 9 – The other Sun Belt member without a football program, Little Rock, announced that it would join the Ohio Valley Conference on July 1, 2022.
 January 7, 2022 – Murray State was announced as a new member of the MVC, effective July 1.
 January 21 – UT Arlington announced it would return to the WAC, in which it had been a member in the 2012–13 school year, effective July 1.
 January 25 – The Colonial Athletic Association announced that it would add three members effective that July—Big South Conference member Hampton, Metro Atlantic Athletic Conference member Monmouth, and Stony Brook, a full member of the America East Conference whose football team was already a member of the legally separate entity of CAA Football.
 January 26 – UIC was announced as a new member of the MVC, effective July 1.
 February 2 – The Sun Belt and James Madison both reported the latter's entry to the conference would be on July 1, rather than 2023.
 February 7 – The University of Southern Indiana, then a member of the Division II Great Lakes Valley Conference, announced that it would begin a transition to Division I in 2022–23, with a D-I conference affiliation to be announced in the coming days. A committee report issued in January indicated three leagues believed to be the ASUN Conference, Horizon League, and Ohio Valley Conference were possible landing spots.
 February 9 – Southern Indiana was announced as a new member of the OVC, effective July 1.
 February 11 – Marshall, Old Dominion, and Southern Miss, which were initially announced as moving from C-USA to the Sun Belt no later than 2023, jointly announced that they intended to leave C-USA later in July. All three schools claimed that in December 2021, they had notified C-USA of their intent to leave C-USA after the 2021–22 school year, but that C-USA did not attempt to negotiate a resolution to this issue. C-USA had stated in late January that it expected the three departing schools to remain in the conference through 2022–23.
 February 22 – The CAA announced that North Carolina A&T would join from the Big South Conference in non-football sports on July 1. (The NCA&T football team remained as a Big South affiliate for the 2022 season and is to join CAA Football in 2023.)
 February 23
 Marshall sued C-USA in a local court in an attempt to make its planned move to the Sun Belt Conference in July.
 The OVC announced the entry of another Division II upgrader, Lindenwood, also in July.
 March 1 – While not directly related to basketball, the Sun Belt Conference's release of its 2022 football schedule notably included all three schools set to move from C-USA (Marshall, Old Dominion, Southern Miss). The SBC release did not mention the ongoing dispute between C-USA and the three schools, or the prospect of those schools being unable to join for the 2022–23 school year.
 March 29
 Conference USA, Marshall, Old Dominion, and Southern Miss issued a joint statement that all parties had reached a settlement that allowed the three schools to join the Sun Belt Conference in July 2022.
 The America East Conference announced that Bryant would join from the Northeast Conference on July 1, 2022.
 April 5 – The Northeast Conference announced the addition of then-current Division II member Stonehill, effective July 1, 2022.
 May 2 – Mount St. Mary's announced it would join the Metro Atlantic beginning July 1, 2022.
 May 6 – Queens University of Charlotte, a member of the Division II South Atlantic Conference, announced it would join the ASUN on July 1, 2022.

Milestones and records
 January 16 and 20 – Caitlin Clark of Iowa recorded consecutive 30-point triple-doubles against Nebraska and Minnesota, becoming the first NCAA Division I player of either sex to accomplish this feat. Clark was also the first women's player in Big Ten Conference history to record consecutive triple-doubles regardless of scoring total.
 January 23 – Ayoka Lee of Kansas State broke the Division I women's single-game scoring record with 61 points in a 94–65 Wildcat win over No. 14 Oklahoma.
 February 8 – Villanova defeated UConn 72–69 in Hartford, Connecticut. This was the first regular-season conference loss for the Huskies since a loss to Notre Dame in March 2013, in the final season for both teams as members of the original Big East Conference. UConn's conference winning streak ended at 145 games in regular-season play, a Division I women's record, and 169 when including conference tournament games (with the latter streak starting after UConn lost to Notre Dame in the 2013 Big East tournament final).
 February 28 – Macee Williams of IUPUI was named Horizon League player of the year for the fourth straight season, making her only the fourth D-I women's player to be a four-time conference player of the year.
 March 18 – In the first round of the NCAA tournament, overall top seed South Carolina defeated Howard 79–21, with Howard's total being a new record for lowest team score in any D-I women's tournament game. The Gamecocks also led the Bison 44–4 at halftime, with Howard's score also being the lowest in a half in tournament history.
 Fresno State's Haley Cavinder ended the season with a new D-I single-season record for free throw percentage at 97.3%.
 Caitlin Clark also ended the season as the first woman to lead Division I in per-game scoring and assists in the same season.
 Iowa also became the first D-I men's or women's program with the national leaders in scoring, assists, and field goal percentage in the same season, with Monika Czinano leading in the last statistic.

Conference membership changes
Eleven schools joined new conferences for the 2021–22 season, including St. Thomas that is transitioning directly from NCAA Division III.

The 2021–22 season was the last for 21 Division I schools in their then-current conferences. Five NCAA Division II schools started transitions to D-I after the season.
 Austin Peay and Queens (NC) respectively left the Ohio Valley Conference (OVC) and the D-II South Atlantic Conference for the ASUN Conference (ASUN).
 Belmont and Murray State, both OVC members, and UIC of the Horizon League left for the Missouri Valley Conference (MVC). 
 Bryant left the Northeast Conference (NEC) for the America East Conference.
 Chicago State left the Western Athletic Conference (WAC); it has yet to announce a new conference home and thus is a D-I independent for the immediate future.
 Hampton, Monmouth, North Carolina A&T, and Stony Brook left their respective conferences (Hampton, NCAT: Big South; Monmouth: MAAC; Stony Brook: America East) for the Colonial Athletic Association.
 Hartford, which started a transition to NCAA Division III in the 2021–22 season, left the America East and will play the 2022–23 season as a D-I independent before joining the D-III Commonwealth Coast Conference in 2023.
 Lamar, which had previously announced it would leave the WAC in July 2023 to return to the Southland Conference, accelerated this move to the 2022–23 season.
 Four schools joined the Sun Belt Conference (SBC)—James Madison from the CAA, and Marshall, Old Dominion, and Southern Miss from Conference USA.
 Lindenwood, Little Rock, and Southern Indiana left their respective conferences (Lindenwood, Southern Indiana: D-II Great Lakes Valley Conference; Little Rock: SBC) for the OVC.
 Loyola Chicago left the MVC for the Atlantic 10 Conference.  
 Mount St. Mary's left the NEC for the Metro Atlantic Athletic Conference (MAAC).
 Southern Utah and UT Arlington respectively left the Big Sky Conference and SBC for the WAC. UT Arlington had been a WAC member in the 2012–13 season. Incarnate Word had announced a move to the WAC, but backed out of that plan and remained in the Southland.
 Stonehill left the D-II Northeast-10 Conference (NE-10) for the NEC.
 Texas A&M–Commerce left the D-II Lone Star Conference for the Southland Conference.

Arenas

New arenas
 This is the first season for High Point at the 4,500-seat Qubein Center (full name: Nido and Mariana Qubein Arena and Conference Center). The new arena was originally intended to open for the 2020–21 season, but was delayed due to COVID-19 issues. The facility officially opened on the weekend of September 24–26; the first women's game was an exhibition against Division II Mount Olive on November 5, 2021, the day after High Point's men played an exhibition at the new arena against the same school. The regular-season opener was a men's and women's doubleheader against nearby Elon on November 9.
 This is the first season for Idaho at the new 4,200-seat Idaho Central Credit Union Arena. The first women's game in the new arena was an exhibition against NAIA member Whitman on November 7, won 64–50 by the Vandals. The first women's regular-season game was on November 14 when the Vandals lost 66–46 to San Diego.

Arena of new D-I team
 St. Thomas plays at its existing on-campus facility, Schoenecker Arena (capacity 1,800).

Arenas closing
The following D-I programs planned to open new arenas for the 2022–23 season. All will move within their current campuses unless otherwise indicated.
 Alabama A&M will leave Elmore Gymnasium for the new Alabama A&M Events Center; the venue is scheduled to open in July 2022.
 Austin Peay planned to leave the on-campus Winfield Dunn Center for the new F&M Bank Arena in downtown Clarksville, Tennessee. However, construction delays led to this move being put off until 2023–24.
 Georgia State will leave GSU Sports Arena for a facility tentatively named Georgia State Arena.
 Texas will leave the Frank Erwin Center, which will be demolished to accommodate an expansion of the university's medical school, for the Moody Center.
 Vermont will leave Patrick Gymnasium for the Tarrant Event Center.

Season outlook

Pre-season polls
The top 25 from the AP and USA Today Coaches Polls.

Regular season top 10 matchups
Rankings reflect the AP poll Top 25.

November 9
 No. 1 South Carolina defeated No. 5 NC State, 66–57 (Reynolds Coliseum, Raleigh, North Carolina)
November 21
 No. 3 Maryland defeated No. 6 Baylor, 79–76 (Xfinity Center, College Park, Maryland)
 No. 1 South Carolina defeated No. 9 Oregon, 80–63 (Battle 4 Atlantis, Paradise Island, Nassau, Bahamas)
November 22
 No. 1 South Carolina defeated No. 2 UConn, 73–57 (Battle 4 Atlantis, Paradise Island, Nassau, Bahamas)
November 25
 No. 5 NC State defeated No. 2 Maryland, 78–60 (Baha Mar Hoops, Baha Mar Convention Center, Nassau, Bahamas)
 No. 7 Stanford defeated No. 4 Indiana, 69–66 (Baha Mar Hoops, Baha Mar Convention Center, Nassau, Bahamas)
November 27
 No. 7 Stanford defeated No. 2 Maryland, 86–67 (Baha Mar Hoops, Baha Mar Convention Center, Nassau, Bahamas)
December 2
 No. 2 NC State defeated No. 6 Indiana, 66–58 (Simon Skjodt Assembly Hall, Bloomington, Indiana)
December 12
 No. 1 South Carolina defeated No. 8 Maryland, 66–59 (Colonial Life Arena, Columbia, South Carolina)
December 18
 No. 3 Stanford defeated No. 7 Tennessee, 74–63 (Thompson–Boling Arena, Knoxville, Tennessee)
December 19
 No. 6 Louisville defeated No. 7 UConn, 69–64 (Mohegan Sun Arena, Uncasville, Connecticut)
December 21
 No. 1 South Carolina defeated No. 2 Stanford, 65–61 (Colonial Life Arena, Columbia, South Carolina)
January 2
 No. 8 Indiana defeated No. 6 Maryland, 70–63OT (Simon Skjodt Assembly Hall, Bloomington, Indiana)
January 20
No. 4 NC State defeated No. 3 Louisville, 68–59 (Reynolds Coliseum, Raleigh, North Carolina)
January 30
No. 2 Stanford defeated No. 8 Arizona, 75–69 (Maples Pavilion, Stanford, California)
January 31
No. 6 Michigan defeated No. 5 Indiana, 65–50 (Crisler Center, Ann Arbor, Michigan)
February 6
No. 10 UConn defeated No. 7 Tennessee, 75–56 (XL Center, Hartford, Connecticut)
February 28
No. 5 Baylor defeated No. 8 Iowa State, 87–62 (Hilton Coliseum, Ames, Iowa)
March 12
No. 7 Texas defeated No. 10 Iowa State, 82–73OT (2022 Big 12 women's basketball tournament, Municipal Auditorium, Kansas City, Missouri)
March 13
No. 7 Texas defeated No. 4 Baylor, 67–58 (2022 Big 12 Women's Basketball Tournament, Municipal Auditorium, Kansas City, Missouri)

Regular season

Early season tournaments
The inaugural women's Battle 4 Atlantis will take place from November 20–22 and will include Buffalo, Minnesota, Oklahoma, Oregon, South Carolina, South Florida, Syracuse and UConn.

Upsets
An upset is a victory by an underdog team. In the context of NCAA Division I women's basketball, this generally constitutes an unranked team defeating a team currently ranked in the top 25. This list will highlight those upsets of ranked teams by unranked teams as well as upsets of No. 1 teams. Rankings are from the AP poll.
Bold type indicates winning teams in "true road games"—i.e., those played on an opponent's home court (including secondary homes).

In addition to the above listed upsets in which an unranked team defeated a ranked team, there have been five non-Division I teams to defeat a Division I team so far this season. Bold type indicates winning teams in "true road games"—i.e., those played on an opponent's home court (including secondary homes).

Conference winners and tournaments
Each of the 32 Division I athletic conferences will end its regular season with a single-elimination tournament. The team with the best regular-season record in each conference receives the number one seed in each tournament, with tiebreakers used as needed in the case of ties for the top seeding. Unless otherwise noted, the winners of these tournaments will receive automatic invitations to the 2022 NCAA Division I women's basketball tournament.

Statistical leaders
Includes postseason games. Division I record in bold.

Postseason

NCAA tournament

Tournament upsets
For this list, an "upset" is defined as a win by a team seeded 5 or more spots below its defeated opponent.

Conference standings

Award winners

All-America teams

The NCAA has never recognized a consensus All-America team in women's basketball. This differs from the practice in men's basketball, in which the NCAA uses a combination of selections by the Associated Press (AP), the National Association of Basketball Coaches (NABC), the Sporting News, and the United States Basketball Writers Association (USBWA) to determine a consensus All-America team. The selection of a consensus team is possible because all four organizations select at least a first and second team, with only the USBWA not selecting a third team.
 
Before the 2017–18 season, it was impossible for a consensus women's All-America team to be determined because the AP had been the only body that divided its women's selections into separate teams. The USBWA first named separate teams in 2017–18. The women's counterpart to the NABC, the Women's Basketball Coaches Association (WBCA), continues the USBWA's former practice of selecting a single 10-member (plus ties) team. The NCAA does not recognize Sporting News as an All-America selector in women's basketball.

Major player of the year awards
Wooden Award: Aliyah Boston, South Carolina
Naismith Award: Aliyah Boston, South Carolina
Associated Press Player of the Year: Aliyah Boston, South Carolina
Wade Trophy: Aliyah Boston, South Carolina
Ann Meyers Drysdale Women's Player of the Year (USBWA): Aliyah Boston, South Carolina
ESPN.com National Player of the Year:

Major freshman of the year awards
Tamika Catchings Award (USBWA):  Aneesah Morrow, DePaul
 WBCA Freshman of the Year: Aneesah Morrow, DePaul
 ESPN.com Freshman of the Year:

Major coach of the year awards
Associated Press Coach of the Year: Kim Mulkey, LSU
Naismith College Coach of the Year: Dawn Staley, South Carolina
 USBWA National Coach of the Year: Dawn Staley, South Carolina
WBCA National Coach of the Year: Dawn Staley, South Carolina
 ESPN.com Coach of the Year: 
 WBCA Assistant Coach of the Year: Kate Paye, Stanford

Other major awards
 Naismith Starting Five:
 Nancy Lieberman Award (top point guard): Caitlin Clark, Iowa
 Ann Meyers Drysdale Award (top shooting guard): Christyn Williams, UConn
 Cheryl Miller Award (top small forward): Ashley Joens, Iowa State
 Katrina McClain Award (top power forward): NaLyssa Smith, Baylor
 Lisa Leslie Award (top center): Aliyah Boston, South Carolina
 WBCA Defensive Player of the Year: Veronica Burton, Northwestern
 Naismith Women's Defensive Player of the Year: Aliyah Boston, South Carolina
 Becky Hammon Mid-Major Player of the Year Award: Kierstan Bell, Florida Gulf Coast
Senior CLASS Award (top senior on and off the court): Lexie Hull, Stanford
Maggie Dixon Award (top rookie head coach): Kelly Rae Finley, Florida
Academic All-American of the Year (top scholar-athlete): Aliyah Boston, South Carolina
Elite 90 Award (top GPA among upperclass players at Final Four): Lexie Hull, Stanford
Pat Summitt Most Courageous Award: Kendall Currence, Northeastern

Coaching changes

See also

2021–22 NCAA Division I men's basketball season

Footnotes

References